The World Axe Throwing League (WATL) is the global governing body of urban axe throwing.

WATL was founded in 2017 by representatives from Canada, the United States of America, Brazil and Ireland. It has 19 axe throwing nations with membership.  Members, including over 175 member companies (affiliates). It organizes international tournament events such as the U.S. Open, Canadian Open, European Open, the North American Arnold Open, South American Arnold Open, and most notably the World Axe Throwing Championship.

It also appoints the Judges that officiate at all sanctioned leagues and tournaments. It promulgates the WATL Code of Conduct, which sets professional standards of discipline for Urban Axe Throwing.

International Axe Throwing Day
This day (13 June) was created by the World Axe Throwing League to celebrate, and raise awareness and unify the sport of urban axe throwing. Though primarily celebrated with affiliates in the WATL, it is also celebrated by anyone with a passion for the sport around the world.

History

2017 

The founding of WATL.

The founding of International Axe Throwing Day (June 13).

Representatives from 5 countries joined the WATL. From the United States, Canada, Ireland, Brazil and Denmark.

The first annual World Axe Throwing Championship is held.

2018 

Evan Walters is announced as the Commissioner of WATL.

Representatives from 10 countries joined the WATL. From the United Kingdom, Turkey, Russia, Spain, the Netherlands, Hungary, Poland, New Zealand, Slovenia, and Indonesia.

The first annual U.S. Open tournament is held.

The second annual World Axe Throwing Championship is held and is the first Urban Axe Throwing production to be featured on ESPN

2019 

Representatives from 4 countries joined the WATL. From South Africa, Australia, Belgium and China.

The first annual Canadian Open tournament is held.

2020 

The Spring and Summer leagues for 2020 have been cancelled as a result of the global pandemic of 2020 (COVID-19). Due to the pandemic and many locations around the world enforcing a quarantine, the WATL helped establish the Quarantine Axe Throwing League with co-founders Tristan Ledbury and Mike Morton. This made headway continuing the sport from the homes of players, so they can continue axe throwing despite the mandatory restrictions on social contact.

WATL implements a new style of playing online with WATL Live.

Mario Zelaya is announced to be the new Commissioner of the World Axe Throwing League, and Evan Walters is moving to Head of Development for the World Knife Throwing League.

2021 

With Covid-19 Restrictions lessened around the World Axe Throwing League seasons reopened for standard League play.

The first affiliated location in India started. 

The World Axe Throwing League announced the formation of a new sister league, the World Knife Throwing League.

At the 2021 World Axe Throwing Championship, Mario Zelaya announced he would be stepping down as Commissioner with QATL founder, Mike Morton to be his replacement.

Scoring 

Scoring is a match system where ten axes are thrown per match. The player with the highest points of their ten thrown axes wins the match. In case of a tie, a "Sudden Death" throw is made for the highest score. Sudden death throws are done until one thrower scores higher than the other. Scoring is determined by where you strike your axe into the target.  The WATL targets have a red bullseye ring, followed by five empty rings, and then a blue ring. The scoring is 6, 5, 4, 3, 2, and 1 point respectively.  Additionally, there are blue dots in the 1 point ring, known as "Kill-shot," and can only be used when called, twice per match for 8 points. Point designation is based on the highest point value the axe touches when it lands and sticks.

WATL Tournaments 

In 2018, WATL started working on a tournament format to help include any throwers who couldn't regularly participate in the WATL axe throwing seasons. This started off by working with Columbus Axe Throwing, to bring Urban Axe Throwing to Columbus, Ohio, for the Arnold Sports Festival (also known as the Arnold Classic or just "the Arnold" and named after Arnold Schwarzenegger) Currently, there are plans to move forward with more tournaments in more locations but currently have only announced three annual tournaments: The Arnold, the U.S. Open, and the Canadian Open.

World Axe Throwing Hatchet Championship 

The World Axe Throwing Championship takes place once a year in December. The format has slight changes from year to year, to be announced before the beginning of the yearly competition. 2018 marks the first time in the sport of axe throwing's history that a Championship has been presented on ESPN.

Axe Throwing Duals World Champions 
The World Axe Throwing Championship added duals as a discipline in 2019. Duals is where two throwers are working together to throw a combined score.

Commissioners of the World Axe Throwing League 
The Commissioner of WATL heads the direction of the World Axe Throwing League.

WATL Members Around the World

References

External links

Axe throwing
Precision sports
Lumberjack sports
Sports organizations established in 2017